5-4-3-2-Run is a Canadian game show for kids that ran from about 1988 to 1990 on CTV in Canada and on many independent stations in the United States. Hosted by Andrew Cochran, the show combined general knowledge questions, wacky stunts and messy surprises similar to Double Dare. The show was taped at the BCTV studios in Burnaby, British Columbia.

Gameplay
Two full games were played during each show. The contestants, known as "runners", were randomly picked out of the studio audience upon a correct response to a question. Four players were chosen for each game, and once chosen they were asked to put on protective capes because some elements of the game were messy.

In each round, a category was given and possible answers were shown on monitors at the end of the playing course. The goal was to pick the answers that fit within the category. To give time to randomize the answers, the players were asked to complete a stunt such as walking on bucket stilts, stomping balloons, picking up straws, etc. Once they reached the bin at the other end of the course, each player chose one of the answers and were also given the option of staying where they were or trading into the one seat that was empty or with another player (in the latter event, the other must agree to the trade for it to take place). When all players were satisfied with their choice, they pushed a plunger on the desk. Those who picked a correct answer moved on to the next round, while those who picked an incorrect answer would get something dumped on their head and be eliminated from further play, but still winning a consolation prize. The two players remaining at the end of the game would move on to the bonus round.

"Surprises"
A player who chose an incorrect answer during gameplay would get a "surprise" dumped on them from a tube above their head as a punishment. Some were witty and humorous, such as ping-pong balls and Monopoly money, while others were gross and nasty, such as baked beans and whipped cream. The most popular surprise however was the shows infamous lumpy slime, which came in one of three colors - either blue (aka the "Blue Goo"), green (aka the "Green Stream") or purple (aka the "Purple Slurple").

Bonus Round
The two winners from each game played in the bonus round. The players were shown four prizes, and were asked to choose the prize they most wanted to play for. If only one player chose a particular prize, that player had to answer only one question to win that prize. If more than one player chose the same prize, then a "face-off" took place with the last person to give a correct answer to a question winning the prize. Nobody left the game empty-handed, at the very least they took home a board game as their prize.

References

External links
5-4-3-2-Run at the History of Canadian Broadcasting website

1988 Canadian television series debuts
1990 Canadian television series endings
Canadian children's game shows
CTV Television Network original programming
1980s Canadian game shows
1990s Canadian game shows
1980s Canadian children's television series
1990s Canadian children's television series
Television shows filmed in Burnaby